, also known as , , , or , are Shinto folk deities[], or kami, of an area of land (the name literally means "land-master-kami").  Their history goes back to at least the 9th century and possibly earlier. Originally, jinushigami were associated with new areas of land opened up for settlement. New residents of the land created shrines to the local resident kami either to gain its blessing/permission, or to bind it within the land to prevent its interference with, or cursing of, nearby humans. Jinushigami may be either ancestors of the original settlers of an area, or ancestors of a clan.

Pop culture
In the manga series Kamisama Kiss by Julietta Suzuki, the heroine Nanami Momozono becomes the tochigami of a derelict shrine.

Relevant Field
Jinushigami can also be found in different religion. In Buddhism, there is a lord call Tudigong which the idea is inhabit in the Taoist ContextTaoism in Japan.

References

 Encyclopedia of Shinto
 Kamata, T. (2017). Myth and Deity in Japan: The Interplay of Kami and Buddhas: Vol. First edition. JPIC[出版文化産業振興財団].
Japanese mythology
Shinto terminology
Shinto kami
Tutelary deities
Chinjusha